Rami "Rambo" Hakanpää (born 9 October 1978) is a Finnish football coach and a former player. He is the manager of PKKU.

Career

Hakanpää started his footballing career at his local club FC Jazz and was signed by HJK in 2000. At HJK he became the fans favorite player, and he made his breakthrough during the 2003 season when HJK won both Finnish Cup and Veikkausliiga. After that Hakanpää had troubles with multiple injuries and spent almost two season in the sidelines. On 2007 he was signed by FC Honka.

In October 2010 Hakanpää was signed back by HJK.

References

Guardian Football

External links
 

1978 births
Living people
Finnish footballers
Finland international footballers
Association football defenders
FC Jazz players
Helsingin Jalkapalloklubi players
FC Honka players
FC Kontu players
Veikkausliiga players
Finnish football managers
Sportspeople from Pori